State Route 792 (SR 792) is a north–south state highway located in southeastern Ohio.

Route description
SR 792 runs through an extremely small portion of northwestern Washington County and part of the southern end of Morgan County. The state highway is not included in the National Highway System.

History
First established in 1937 along the path that is currently occupies between SR 676 and SR 266, SR 792 has not experienced any significant changes to its routing since its inception.

Major intersections

References

792
Transportation in Washington County, Ohio
Transportation in Morgan County, Ohio